The fuddle duddle incident in Canadian political history occurred on February 16, 1971, when Prime Minister of Canada Pierre Trudeau was alleged to have spoken or at least mouthed unparliamentary language in the House of Commons, causing a minor scandal.  Trudeau mentioned the words "fuddle duddle" in an ambiguous answer to questions about what he may or may not have said in Parliament.

In February 1971, opposition MPs accused Trudeau of having mouthed the words "fuck off" at them in the House of Commons. When pressed by television reporters on the matter, Trudeau would only freely admit having moved his lips, answering the question, "What were you thinking, when you moved your lips?" by rhetorically asking in return "What is the nature of your thoughts, gentlemen, when you say 'fuddle duddle' or something like that? God, you guys!" Thus, it remained unclear what Trudeau actually mouthed.

In a 2015 speech, his son, and later Prime Minister, Justin Trudeau stated that his father "didn't actually just say 'fuddle duddle'".

Origin of the phrase
Trudeau may have coined the phrase on the spot.  It did not gain wide currency in the long term, and did not enter most dictionaries of Canadian English other than the Canadian Oxford Dictionary.

Media coverage
An unofficial transcript of the CBC clip is as follows:

In popular culture
There was, in 1971–72, a short-lived satirical magazine called Fuddle Duddle, which aspired to be the Canadian equivalent of Mad magazine. However, it lasted only five issues before publication ceased.

At least two songs related to the incident were released as record singles, and made the lower reaches of the Canadian charts. "Fuddle Duddle" by Antique Fair was written by Greg Hambleton and released on the Tuesday label through Quality Records (catalogue GH107X), reaching #68 on RPM's national chart.  "Do the Fuddle Duddle" was written by Gary Alles, performed by The House of Commons and released on GRT Records (catalogue 1233-04).  It peaked at #82 on the RPM chart.  Members of the ad hoc group "The House of Commons" later helped form the successful Canadian chart group Dr. Music. The Rolf Harris song "Vancouver Town '71" (#68 in Canada) also mentions how Alaskan oil could "leave our coast all fuddle-duddled up".

Mont Tremblant Resort has a ski run named Fuddle Duddle. Trudeau had been a regular visitor to the resort in the past.

Justin Trudeau

A similar incident took place on December 14, 2011, when Trudeau's son Justin, MP for Papineau, during Question Period in the House of Commons, shouted out the words "piece of shit" when Peter Kent, the Conservative Environment Minister, criticized NDP environment critic Megan Leslie for not attending the Durban Conference on climate change, despite the government banning all opposition MPs from joining Canada's delegation. Later on, when Justin Trudeau was prime minister, another incident occurred on May 4, 2022, when Conservative MP John Brassard accused Trudeau of "unparliamentary language" and "dropping an F-bomb" during a heated debate in Question Period. Upon leaving the chamber, Trudeau was asked by reporters to comment on the allegations; in an apparent reference to his father's response to the Fuddle Duddle controversy, he said, "what is the nature of your thoughts, gentlemen, when you say — when you move your lips in a particular way?"

Reporting the results of the 2015 Canadian federal election, the Toronto Sun newspaper front cover headline was "Fuddle Duddle" in response to the Justin Trudeau Liberal majority outcome.

See also
 Just society
 Just watch me
 Trudeauism
 Trudeaumania

References

External links
 
 Justin Trudeau references his father's response to the Fuddle Duddle incident after a similar controversy over his language in Parliament (video). CPAC.

English phrases
1971 neologisms
Canadian political phrases
Political controversies in Canada
Pierre Trudeau
Euphemisms
Political history of Canada